Gone Girl may refer to:

 Gone Girl (album), a 1978 album by Johnny Cash
"Gone Girl" (song) from the album by Johnny Cash
 "Gone Girl", a song by SZA from the 2022 album SOS
 Gone Girl (novel), a 2012 thriller novel by Gillian Flynn
 Gone Girl (film), a 2014 film based on the novel, directed by David Fincher
 Gone Girl (soundtrack), a soundtrack album for the 2014 film
 "Gone Girl", a short story written by Ross Macdonald
 "Gone Girl" (The Vampire Diaries), an episode of the TV series The Vampire Diaries which first aired in 2014

See also
Girls Gone By Publishers, a UK publisher